Sailing at the 2019 Military World Games was held in Wuhan, China from 20 to 22 October 2019. Racing was done in the 470 class.

Medal summary

References 

 2019 Military World Games Results - Page 212

Golf
2019
2019
World Military Sailing Championship